House of Cards: A Tale of Hubris and Wretched Excess on Wall Street is the second book written by William D. Cohan. It was released on March 10, 2009 by Doubleday.

Overview
The book chronicles the history of Bear Stearns, from its founding in 1923 to its fire sale to JP Morgan in 2008, following the subprime mortgage crisis. It also gives the reader an inside glance of Bear Stearns senior management and the company's growth into the fifth largest investment firm, before its collapse.

Profiles of bank executives
The book documents the rise of Alan "Ace" Greenberg, and his unsuccessful power struggle with bridgemaster and bond trader James Cayne, the power struggle between "co-presidents" Warren J. Spector & Alan Schwartz, and the recklessness of the over-leveraged hedge fund supervised by Richard A. Marin and Ralph R. Cioffi. The text also tells the story of Salim Lewis.

Awards
The book was on the long list for the 2009 Financial Times and Goldman Sachs Business Book of the Year Award.   Tim Rutten characterized the book as a "masterfully reported account", and credited the author with a "remarkable gift for plain-spoken explanation."

References

External links
After Words interview with Cohan on House of Cards, May 14, 2009

Works about the subprime mortgage crisis
Books about traders
Bear Stearns
JPMorgan Chase
Finance books
Books about companies
2009 non-fiction books
Business books
Doubleday (publisher) books